Neustrelitz-Land is an Amt in the Mecklenburgische Seenplatte district, in Mecklenburg-Vorpommern, Germany. The seat of the Amt is in Neustrelitz, itself not part of the Amt.

The Amt Neustrelitz-Land consists of the following municipalities:
 Blankensee
 Blumenholz
 Carpin
 Godendorf
 Grünow
 Hohenzieritz
 Klein Vielen
 Kratzeburg
 Möllenbeck
 Userin
 Wokuhl-Dabelow

Ämter in Mecklenburg-Western Pomerania
Mecklenburgische Seenplatte (district)